No One's Son is a 2008 Croatian film directed by Arsen Anton Ostojić. It is based on a play by Mate Matišić. The film won the Big Golden Arena for Best Film at the 2008 Pula Film Festival, the Croatian national film awards.

References

External links
 

2008 films
Croatian crime drama films
2000s Croatian-language films
Croatian films based on plays